Prathamesh Laghate is an Indian singer in Marathi film industry. He was finalist in Sa Re Ga Ma Pa Marathi L'il Champs in the year 2008–09. He was among the finalist with Aarya Ambekar, Kartiki Gaikwad, Mugdha Vaishampayan, Rohit Raut. Prathamesh made his way into the Marathi film industry with the movie Duniyadari where he crooned for superstar Swapnil Joshi in the foot-tapping number 'Yaara Yaara'. That's how he got his first break in Marathi movies

Childhood
Prathamesh is from music loving Karhade Brahmin family from Ratnagiri.

Career
He has made performances in television and various festivals in the light music and film music.

Album
Universal Music India and Zee Marathi joined hands to come up with a string of albums showcasing the rich tradition of music in Maharashtra Panchratna. It is a compilation of some of the great performances by the Little Champs: Kartiki Gaikawad, Rohit Raut, Aarya Ambekar, Prathmesh Laghate and Mugdha Vaishampayan.

Public Appearances
A few events where Prathamesh has performed –

 Little Champs live shows in many cities like Mumbai, Pune, Nashik Sangli, Aurangabad, Goa, Ratnagiri, Thane, Nagpur, Wardha, Bhopal, etc. and at international venues like Dubai, Abu Dhabi. These are runaway popular shows where Aarya Ambekar performs with four other Little Champs Mugdha Vaishampayan, Prathamesh Laghate, Rohit Raut and Kartiki Gaikwad in perfect sync. This group is known as 'Panch-Ratna'.
 As a celebrity guest in Ashtavinayak Darshan along with Aarya Ambekar. Ashtavinayak Darshan program consists visits to the eight holy temples of Lord Ganesha (Ashtavinayaka) situated around Pune district. This program was telecast on Star Majha channel during the Ganpati Festival from 11 to 18 September 2010.

References

External links

Living people
Indian male singers
Marathi-language singers
1995 births